Erik Rico is an American musician, singer, songwriter, producer, and DJ.

Biography
Erik Rico was born in North Carolina and raised between New York and North Carolina.

In 1997, Erik Rico was signed by Columbia Records executive Randy Jackson. He has written and produced music for Jurassic 5, Planet Asia, 4th Avenue Jones and Ladybug Mecca (Digable Planets). In 2001, he wrote and produced for Q-Tip (A Tribe Called Quest), Jasmine Guy, Malcolm Jamal Warner, and Tre'(The Pharcyde) on Tupac Shakur's "The Rose that Grew from Concrete" for Amaru/Interscope Records. As a DJ, he was hired as a sound designer for artist/photographer David LaChapelle.

Between 2007 and 2011, he toured Morocco, Tunisia, Algeria, Indonesia and the Islamic Society of North America convention as a member of the, Hip Hop Ambassador program, an extension of the Remarkable Current Music Collective, sponsored by the United States, State Department's Performance Arts Initiative, a program to present positive examples of African American musicians to the international community. On August 1, 2013, Erik Rico released Love's Dance Vol. 1, a series of various styles of dance music.

Discography

Albums 
 Povi (Carmen Rizzo) - Life in Volcanoes - producer/co-writer - (Nettwerk Records, 2000)
 The Rose that Grew from Concrete - Tupac Shakur - producer/writer - (Amaru/Interscope Records, 2001)
 No plan B - 4th Avenue Jones - producer/co-writer - (Look Alive/Interscope Records, 2002)
 Still in Training - Planet Asia - producer/co-writer - (Liquor Barrell, 2003)
 Journey Back To Me (LifeNotes Music, 2007)
 Higher Frequency (LifeNotes Music, 2009)
 Love's Dance, Vol. 1 (LifeNotes Music, 2013)

Singles 
 Do Re Mi - 4th Avenue Jones - Producer/co-writer (Interscope Records, 2002)
 The Life - Remix - Mystic -(Goodvibe/Interscope Recordings, 2003)
 Linguistics - Jurassic 5 - producer/co-writer (Up Above Records, 2005)
 Sometimes - Ladybug Mecca (Digable Planets) - producer/co-writer (Nu Paradigm Entertainment, 2005)
 Coming Up - Dave Ghetto - producer/co-writer (Counterflow Recordings, 2005)
 Wonderful - Erik Rico - (Columbia Records Japan, 2007)
 Melody - DJ Spinna & Erik Rico, (Highwater, 2009)
 Sweetest Taboo - Sade/Erik Rico, (LifeNotes Music, 2009) 
 "Special Kind of Fool- TY, featuring Erik Rico -(BBE records, 2010)
 Sensation - Ron Trent & Erik Rico (FutureVision records, 2010)
 Everybody - Grooveman Spot, featuring Erik Rico (Planet Groove/Jazzy Sport Japan, 2010)
 Just Love - Erik Rico/Marc Mac (4hero) feat. on the compilation "The Heart Vol. 2" (Tokyo Dawn Records, 2011)
 Our World - Opolopo - (Deep house remix) (Tokyo Dawn Records, 2011)
 My Prayer - Erik Rico - (LifeNotes Music, 2012)
 Under The Sun - Erik Rico/Missoles - (ManyVibes Music, 2012)
 Babylon - LifeNotes Sound System - (LifeNotes Music, 2012)
 So Sexy - Gus, featuring Erik Rico - (LifeNotes Music, 2013)
 Dance With Me - Erik Rico/Nicolas Vautier - (ClubStar, 2013)
 Start This Party - R. Schneider, feat Erik Rico - (Epoque Music, 2013)
 So Divine - Erik Rico - (LifeNotes Music, 2013)
 Penny - Erik Rico - (LifeNotes Music, 2013)
 Grown Man Hustle - Shabaam Sahdeeq featuring Erik Rico - (Below System Records, 2014)
 Through The Night - Jonna lliffe, feat Erik Rico - (City Fly/Shadeleaf, 2016)

Film/TV 
 They Call Me Sirr - (The Sirr Parker Story)-(Showtime Network, 2003)
 Night at the Grand Star -(PBS original series documentary, 2003)

References

External links
 Official Site
 uplftmnt interview with Erik Rico on his faith and his thoughts on God

Date of birth missing (living people)
Living people
African-American DJs
21st-century African-American male singers
African-American songwriters
African-American record producers
Record producers from North Carolina
Year of birth missing (living people)